Eulima fulvocincta is a species of sea snail, a marine gastropod mollusk in the family Eulimidae. The species is one of a number within the genus Eulima.

Distribution

This species occurs in the following locations:

 Caribbean Sea
 Gulf of Mexico
 Hispaniola
 Jamaica
 Lesser Antilles
 Panama
 Puerto Rico

Description 
The maximum recorded shell length is 6.6 mm.

Habitat 
Minimum recorded depth is 0 m. Maximum recorded depth is 115 m.

References

External links

fulvocincta
Gastropods described in 1850